Jozef Szekeres (born 4th July 1970) is an Australian artist, animator, writer, toy designer, sculptor, creative director and arts lecturer, and a director of the Black Mermaid Productions creative team based in Australia. He is best known for his doll creation Elizabet Bizelle, launched through his company Jozef Szekeres Dolls in 2003. He was a finalist in the 2011 Australian Cartoonist Association Stanley Awards, with nominations for Best Australian Illustrator and Australian Comic Book Artist.

He co-created and illustrated the comic book series ElfQuest – WaveDancers circa 1993–94, and is currently in production of a new comic book series called Elf-Fin: Hyfus & Tilaweed in collaboration with co-creator Julie Ditrich, using the original characters and concepts they created for the previous series. A preview was released in April 2011, with a later edition released in May 2013.

Early life
Szekeres was born in Blacktown, Sydney, and grew up near Gosford on the Central Coast of NSW, graduating in 1988 from the Central Coast Grammar School in Erina, Central Coast. He attended the Sydney Conservatorium of Music in the Music Composition School but did not graduate. In 1989, he moved to the Sydney CBD to work at the Walt Disney Animation Australia Studio, now known as DisneyToon Studios, and was the youngest animator employed there at that time.

Career

Animation
At Walt Disney Animation Australia, he was a principal animator on a series of films and TV series.

On Aladdin: The Return of Jafar and Aladdin and the King of Thieves, he animated both Jasmine and Aladdin, creating reference maquettes of both characters. He did development work on Belle for Beauty and the Beast: The Enchanted Christmas 2. On The Little Mermaid II: Return to the Sea, he animated the Ariel, Melody and Prince Eric characters. On Lady and the Tramp II: Scamp's Adventure, he focused on human characters, such as the adult Wendy and the mermaids in Return to Never Land. He also sculpted a reference maquette of Wendy. His final work for DisneyToons Australia was on The Jungle Book 2 as senior animator on Shanti.

Szekeres began working on Disney television productions such as title and episode animation of both Tarzan and Jane for Tarzan & Jane. He did character development work and animation on the lead female role Dylandra for Bonkers, and Jasmine and Aladdin on the Aladdin TV series. On Gargoyles, Szekeres animated key sequences of Elisa Maza and Goliath for the "Seeing Isn't Believing" episode. Other television work includes Goof Troop, Darkwing Duck, and Winnie the Pooh.

As a freelance 2D animator and Animation Director, he created television commercials for both Australian and international markets. Most notably Finlandia Vodka Pulp, Mr Sheen, Strongbow Cider Cyborg and Blowtorch, Cafe with Billy for Nescafe, The Fifth Finger for KitKat, and FantasticRiceCrackers for Fantastic.

Szekeres animated the full episodes of Boy from Woy (1999 TV Series) (with additional animation done by Steve Moltzen) for Mudfish, and for Catflap Animation Petals: Windy Weather (1998 TV Series). Outside of animation but still in the film industry, Szekeres was also a conceptual designer on the feature films, Dark City and Cut, and has worked occasionally over the past 15 years with MEG (Make-up Effects Group Studio) on their commercials and feature films as a conceptualist and sculptor.

Comic books
Szekeres left Walt Disney Animation Australia in 1993 to illustrate the comic book series ElfQuest – WaveDancers, which he co-created with Julie Ditrich and Bruce Love. The rights to the WaveDancers' characters are now held by Black Mermaid Productions in Sydney Australia.

Szekeres then worked with Sirius Entertainment on two issues of the Safety-Belt Man comic book series before undertaking Erik Larsen's character in the Dart miniseries published by Image Comics.

Szekeres returned to Sirius Entertainment in 1999 to work with Joseph Michael Linsner and his Dawn character, and created new mermaid representations of the Goddess character for two publications, Dreams of Dawn Wizard #1/2, and Dawn: Return of the Goddess #3.

Szekeres returned to work with Julie Ditrich on Elf-Fin: Hyfus & Tilaweed, first published in 2011.

Illustration
Szekeres' illustration works have been collected several times in books, magazines, and journals, highlights being Stripped Uncensored and Completely Stripped published 2009 and 2010 respectively in Germany by Bruno Gmünder. Szekeres also featured in leading campaigns, such as the 2007 Sydney Mardi Gras, and 2008 Sleaze Ball (which is also part of the Sydney Mardi Gras). For the 2008 Sleaze Ball, titled Villains Lair, a collector card set consisting of 16 of Szekeres's villainous artworks created specifically for the event were released for members and partygoers. Szekeres released his own collector card set (or loose leaf book) The Art of Jozef Szekeres: Mermaids & Mermers in 2008 collecting 100 artworks. They range from unpublished pieces early in his career to his most recent published works of that time.

Gaming
Szekeres worked in the gaming industry as a senior illustrator/animator for Aristocrat from 2001 to 2006. His work includes: Dinosaur, Queen of Sheba, Antony and Cleopatra, Butterfly Kiss (cover of the Aristocrat 2008 NSW Catalogue), Love Stuck, Wild Waratah, Heart of Vegas (used for an Aristocrat Catalogue cover), Miss Kitty, Moonlight Waltz.

As a freelancer, Szekeres created gaming art packages for The Last King of Egypt and Treasured Discovery for NexGen. He also released game highlights for TrueBlue: Fire Chief for Atronic 2009, World Safari for IGT 2010, Aztec Beauty for Aruze 2011.

Sculptor and toy designer
Szekeres has had a fascination with figural sculpture from childhood. Early in his career he sculpted maquettes for Disney's Aladdin and Jasmine, Dylandra, and adult Wendy. Szekeres further explored sculpture adding new sculptural elements to Barbie and G.I. Joe purchased toy parts.

In 2003, Szekeres released his first fashion character/doll Elizabet Bizelle (with sister character Kotalin Bizelle) titled Dangerous Discovery, the first Australian created fashion doll.

In 2006, Szekeres released his doll editions Elizabet Bizelle Lady in Red, and Kotalin Bizelle Birthday Bash.

In November 2020, Szekeres released his GlamourOZ Dolls Collection of 10 editions. It reintroduced his new sculpts of original caucasian characters Kotalin & Elizabet Bizelle. It also now includes two new characters, Asian Lucielle Lei and Australian Aborigine Bindi Merinda (which reflects Australia's cultural diversity). The Kotalin Bizelle doll "Ribbon Reveal" was the recipient of the 2020 DOLLS Award of Excellence Industry Choice Winner. Ten editions were released. Eight titled mainline editions were released, each edition numbering 375. Two variant editions each numbering 100, featuring hair color variations.

2000 Sydney Millennium Olympic Games
The 2000 Sydney Mascots, Ollie, Syd and Millie – three native Australian animals that represent earth, air and water – were designed by Jozef Szekeres and Matt Hatton. Szekeres also created the original three-dimensional physical sculptures/maquettes of these mascots.

Exhibits
Szekeres had his first solo art exhibition in Sydney, Australia in November 2011. The guest speaker at the launch night was Colleen Doran. The Exhibition was curated by Charles Heyen.

See also 
 Elfquest

References

Australian artists
Living people
1970 births